John David Yeadon Peel  (1941–2015) was a British Africanist, sociologist and historian of religion in Africa, particularly in Nigeria. He was most notable for his studies of historical patterns of religious belief among the Yoruba people.

Biography
John David Yeadon Peel was born in Dumfries, Scotland on 11 November 1941 and was educated at King Edward's School, Birmingham and Balliol College, Oxford. He gained a doctorate in sociology from the London School of Economics (LSE) on Independent Churches in Nigeria. He held a succession of academic posts at universities in the United Kingdom and Nigeria, finishing his career at the School of Oriental and African Studies (SOAS). As well as African subjects, he retained an interest in the history of sociology and taught social theory. He authored a biography of the sociologist Herbert Spencer in 1971.

Peel was one of the first scholars to examine the theology and organisation of African independent churches. Paul Gifford wrote that "[his] thrust was generally Weberian, insisting that religion could not be reduced to material or class interests". He published three cumulative works on religious change among the Yoruba people in Nigeria between 1968 and 2015, exploring aspects of Christianity, Islam and indigenous belief among the Yoruba from the pre-colonial period onwards. Robin W. G. Horton's "intellectualist theory" of African religion was first set out in a review of Peel's 1968 volume.

Peel was a fellow and vice-president (1999-2000) of the British Academy and president of the African Studies Association of the United Kingdom (ASAUK; 1996–98). He was awarded the ASAUK's "Distinguished Africanist" award in 2015. He was editor of Africa: Journal of the International Africa Institute from 1979 to 1986. Toyin Falola edited a festschrift in Peel's honour entitled Christianity and Social Change in Africa in 2005.

Peel died in London on 2 November 2015 and was buried on the eastern side of Highgate Cemetery.

Selected publications
Aladura: a Religious Movement among the Yoruba (Oxford: Oxford University Press, 1968)
Ijeshas and Nigerians: the Incorporation of a Yoruba Kingdom 1890s-1970s (Cambridge: Cambridge University Press, 1984)
Religious Encounter and the Making of the Yoruba (Bloomington: Indiana University Press, 2000)
Christianity, Islam and the Orisa: Comparative Studies of Three Religions in Interaction and Transformation (Oakland: University of California Press, 2015).

References

Bibliography

Further reading

External links
Professor J.D.Y. Peel at British Academy.

People from Dumfries
1941 births
2015 deaths
Burials at Highgate Cemetery
Scottish Africanists
Historians of Nigeria
Yoruba religion
People educated at King Edward's School, Birmingham
Alumni of Balliol College, Oxford
Alumni of the London School of Economics
Academics of SOAS University of London
British historians of religion
Scottish sociologists
20th-century Scottish historians
Fellows of the British Academy
21st-century Scottish historians
Presidents of the African Studies Association of the United Kingdom